Guideposts is a spiritual non-profit organization that encourages wellness through inspirational content creation. Founded in 1945 by Dr. Norman Vincent Peale, Raymond Thornburg, and Peale's wife, Ruth Stafford Peale with just one inaugural magazine, Guideposts has since grown to publish annual devotionals, books about faith, Christian fiction novels, five spiritual magazines, prayer content, as well as a content-rich website for daily inspiration. Guideposts has outreach programs to encourage wellness and help lifts the spirits of those in need – including military personnel, military families, support groups, hospitalized children, etc.

The Guideposts organization, which also maintains an outreach ministry service, is currently headquartered in Danbury, Connecticut, with additional offices in New York City.

The Guideposts magazine
The March, 1945 issue of Guideposts magazine, was distributed to 10,000 households. There were four short articles, one for each week of the month. That inaugural issue contained a story by World War I Ace, Eddie Rickenbacker entitled I Believe In Prayer, which told of a plane crash during World War II that left eight men, in three life rafts, stranded on the Pacific Ocean.

Although a fire destroyed the magazine's circulation files in 1947, the publication was saved thanks to publicity from radio broadcaster Lowell Thomas, and an article in Reader's Digest. By 1952, there were 500,000 subscribers to the magazine and in 2018 circulation was more than 2,000,000 subscribers and receivers of the outreach gifting programs in the United States. The magazine is non-denominational, avoids politics and controversy, and for many years did not accept advertising.

Each issue of Guideposts magazine contains articles by people of all ages, races, and backgrounds, recounting how their faith in God, or the wisdom of an older relative or mentor, helped them through personal challenges. These can include grief, poverty, relocation, serious personal or family illness, unemployment, health issues, caregiver stress and strained personal relationships. Surviving natural disasters, accidents, and becoming stranded on wilderness adventures are also frequent topics. 
Most articles contain a photograph of the author, along with an illustration showing the situation. 
Lead cover articles often feature the story of a noted entertainer, professional athlete, or other celebrity who rose from poverty.  The magazine also judges and awards monetary awards for stories by teenage authors.  Guideposts is nonsectarian and welcomes Protestant, Catholic, Jewish writers, and more.  A separate youth edition, published for several years, has been discontinued.

Frequency of magazine issues
For much of its history Guideposts published twelve issues a year. Starting in 2019 the periodical was published ten times a year, with the June/July and December/January issues being two-month editions. Starting with the June/July 2021 issue Guideposts became a bimonthly magazine, with six issues being published each year. Each issue was expanded to 100 pages, an increase of 30 pages from earlier issues.

List of Guideposts Books
Guideposts curates and authors multiple genres of books, all of which are uplifting and spiritual. The books range from religious prayer, to daily devotionals, to one-off inspirational novels and full cozy mystery fiction series.

Devotionals
Guideposts provides free daily devotions on their website to help those seeking inspiration, comfort, and closeness to their faith. Guideposts also releases annual devotional books and magazines for purchase, or donation.

Bible Resources
Guideposts provides free daily devotions on their website to help those seeking inspiration, comfort, and closeness to their faith. Guideposts also releases annual devotional books and magazines for purchase, or donation.

Writing contests
Guideposts Magazine sponsors two writing contests. The annual Guideposts Young Writers Contest awards a total of $25,000 in scholarship funds to high school juniors and seniors whose personal true stories are chosen for publication in the magazine. The Guideposts Writers Workshop Contest, held every other year, offers winners a free writing clinic with established authors in Rye, New York, for five days, all expenses paid.

References

External links
Guideposts website

Christian magazines
Magazines established in 1945
Magazines published in Connecticut
Non-profit organizations based in Connecticut
Christian organizations established in 1945
Companies based in Danbury, Connecticut